"Schism" is a song by American rock band Tool.  It was the first single and music video from their third full-length album, Lateralus. In 2002, Tool won the Grammy Award for Best Metal Performance for the song. "Schism" was released as a DVD single on December 20, 2005. The DVD contains the music video, audio commentary by David Yow, and a remix by Lustmord.

Background

Most of the songs on Lateralus use math and science as metaphors for human issues. Singer Maynard James Keenan says, "They're all about relationships. Learning how to integrate communication back into a relationship. How are we as lovers, as artists, as brothers - how are we going to reconstruct this beautiful temple that we've built and that's tumbled down? It's universal relationship stuff." As for the trademark hook, bassist Justin Chancellor said, "The twiddly 'Schism' riff came from fooling around. I just play as much as possible, and I don't write stuff down - so when I get a good idea, I play it until I can't forget it."

Overview
"Schism" is known as a prime example of Tool's use of complex rhythms and changing meters. It is also well known for its distinctive bass line throughout. An extended version of the song is performed live. "Schism" was Tool's only entry on the Billboard Hot 100 until "Fear Inoculum" in 2019, peaking at number 67 and staying on the charts for 20 weeks. It also hit number two on both the Alternative Songs and Mainstream Rock Tracks charts. It almost reached number one on both charts, but was blocked behind Staind's "It's Been Awhile".

The song is featured in the video game Guitar Hero World Tour.

Time signature

"Schism" is renowned for its use of uncommon time signatures and the frequency of its meter changes. In one analysis of the song, the song alters meter 47 times.

The middle section is subsequently introduced at 3:29, maintaining a group of three bars of  then one of  until 5:02.

It breaks down with a measure of  then .  then  repeats 3 times then  and  once. The signature riff takes over again,  then .

Track listing
Promotional single

DVD

Credits and personnel
Tool
Danny Carey – drums
Justin Chancellor – bass
Adam Jones – guitar
Maynard James Keenan – vocals

Production
Produced by David Bottrill
Art direction by Adam Jones

Chart performance

Certifications

References

2001 singles
Tool (band) songs
Grammy Award for Best Metal Performance
2001 songs
Volcano Entertainment singles
Song recordings produced by David Bottrill
Songs written by Maynard James Keenan
Songs written by Danny Carey
Songs written by Justin Chancellor
Songs written by Adam Jones (musician)